Allison Lin is a Taiwanese actress.

Filmography

Television series

Films

References

External links
 
 

1985 births
21st-century Taiwanese actresses
Living people
Actresses from Taipei